The 1950 season was the 27th season of the Slovenian Republic League and the fifth in the SFR Yugoslavia. Korotan Kranj have won the league title for the first time.

Final table

External links
Football Association of Slovenia 

Slovenian Republic Football League seasons
Yugo
3
Yugo
3
Football